Cha Meeyoung, sometimes known as Mia, is an associate professor at KAIST in the School of Computing and a chief investigator in the Pioneer Research Center for Mathematical and Computational Sciences at the Institute for Basic Science. Her research focuses on network and data science with an emphasis on modeling, analyzing complex information propagation processes, machine learning-based computational social science, and deep learning. She has served on the editorial boards of the journals PeerJ and ACM Transactions on Social Computing.

Education
The entirety of Meeyoung's higher education has taken place at the Korea Advanced Institute of Science and Technology (KAIST) in Daejeon, South Korea. Majoring in computer science, she graduated magna cum laude for her B.S. The adviser for her M.S. was Kim Taewhan, and her Ph.D. was supervised by Sue Moon.

Career
In 2008, Meeyoung worked as a postdoc in Max Planck Institute for Software Systems under adviser Krishna Gummadi. Leaving Max Planck, she returned to her alma mater and became an assistant professor in the Graduate School of Culture Technology later becoming an associate professor joint faculty member in the School of Computing. Outside of KAIST, she worked as a scientific and technical consultant for both SK Telecom and the Korea Internet Self-Governance Organization in 2010 and 2014, respectively.

In 2015, Meeyoung went to Menlo Park to work as a visiting professor with Facebook's Data Science Team hosted by Lada Adamic. In 2019, she and Oum Sang-il were the founding chief investigators of the Pioneer Research Center for Mathematical and Computational Sciences at the Institute for Basic Science (IBS). This and the Pioneer Research Center for Biomolecular and Cellular Structure are the first of two such centers at IBS.  Headed by Meeyoung, the Data Science Group researches fake news, perception biases in relation to AI, deep learning of heterogeneous data for modeling human behavior, and prediction efforts through language processing and image analysis. Seeing the infodemic on COVID-19 information starting in China and spreading to Korea and the US, the Data Science Group and researchers from Ewha Womans University, started the multilingual Facts Before Rumors campaign to separate common claims seen online.

Awards and honors
2022: Commendation, 55th Science Day, Ministry of Science and ICT
2020: Test of Time Award, International Conference on Web and Social Media
2019: Young Information Scientist Award
2016: Lifetime member, Korean Institute of Information Scientists and Engineers (ko)
2012: Best Paper, International AAAI Conference on Web and Social Media
2009: Best Data Workshop Paper, 3rd Int'l AAAI Conference on Weblogs and Social Media
2007: Best Paper, ACM Internet Measurement Conference

Editorial boards
2016–present PeerJ
2016–present ACM Transactions on Social Computing

Selected publications

References

External links
PRC for Mathematical and Computational Sciences - Data Science Group

KAIST Data Science Lab

Academic staff of KAIST
1979 births
Living people
KAIST alumni
Institute for Basic Science
21st-century South Korean mathematicians
South Korean women computer scientists
South Korean computer scientists
21st-century South Korean women scientists
21st-century South Korean scientists
21st-century women mathematicians
South Korean women mathematicians
South Korean scientists